Amit Uniyal is an Indian first-class cricketer. An all rounder, he played for Punjab in first-class cricket, and for Rajasthan Royals in the Indian Premier League.

A left-handed all-rounder, Uniyal made his debut in 2001–02 for Punjab. A seamer, Uniyal has picked up 89 wickets in first-class cricket and has scored 760 runs at an average of just over 23.

Domestic career 
Amit uniyal made his Ranji Trophy debut in 2001–2002 against Himachal at PCA stadium Mohali . He got 6 wickets and scored 57 runs in his debut match.

He played 4 matches in his debut year and got 20 wickets. And played Ranjii Trophy until the year 2010/2011. In the year 2003 he got selected in Duleep trophy in which he got 13 wickets in 3 matches. His highlighting feature were 6 wickets in 1st match. He played Deodhar trophy from 2002 to 2004. in the year 2003, he got selected in Board president XL Team against Touring New Zealand Team. In the same year he was called for India camp held in Bangalore.

Indian Premier League
Signed by the Rajasthan Royals early in 2010 after the unauthorised Indian Cricket League folded and ended his employment, he made his debut against Mumbai Indians on 13 March 2010. He bowled 4 overs for 41 runs, taking two wickets including that of Sanath Jayasuriya.

External links
 

Indian cricketers
Punjab, India cricketers
North Zone cricketers
Rajasthan Royals cricketers
Living people
1981 births
People from Punjab, India
ICL India XI cricketers
Chandigarh Lions cricketers